The 1997–98 Indiana Hoosiers men's basketball team represented Indiana University. Their head coach was Bobby Knight, who was in his 27th year. The team played its home games in  Assembly Hall in Bloomington, Indiana, and was a member of the Big Ten Conference.

The Hoosiers finished the regular season with an overall record of 20–12 and a conference record of 9–7, finishing 5th in the Big Ten Conference. After losing to Purdue in the quarterfinals of the inaugural Big Ten tournament, the Hoosiers were invited to dance in the 1998 NCAA tournament. However, IU lost in the second round to Connecticut.

Roster

Schedule/Results

|-
!colspan=8 style=| Non-conference regular season

|-
!colspan=9 style=|Big Ten regular season

|-
!colspan=9 style=|Big Ten tournament

|-
!colspan=9 style=|NCAA tournament

References

Indiana Hoosiers men's basketball seasons
Indiana
Indiana
1997 in sports in Indiana
1998 in sports in Indiana